Pseudopostega paraplicatella is a moth of the family Opostegidae. It was described by Donald R. Davis and Jonas R. Stonis, 2007. It is known from Amazonian rainforest of eastern Ecuador.

The length of the forewings is about 3 mm. Adults have been recorded in January.

Etymology
The species name is derived from Latin, para (meaning beside, near), and the species name Pseudopostega plicatella, in reference to the close morphological similarities of these two species.

References

Opostegidae
Moths described in 2007